Africa Justice Foundation (AJF) was a UK-registered charity established by three British barristers, Cherie Blair CBE (Cherie Booth QC), Philip Riches and Suella Fernandes in 2010. AJF worked to build robust, stable, and predictable legal systems across sub-Saharan Africa with projects in Ethiopia, Rwanda, Tanzania and Kenya.

Cherie Blair argued that a strong and reliable legal system is crucial for emerging economies to thrive economically, politically and socially.

AJF’s programmes focused on four pillars: promoting open access to legal information; providing access to justice; improving the quality of legislation; and training in commercial legal skills, across the continent. Early in its history, AJF provided postgraduate scholarships for over twenty legislative drafters from Sierra Leone, Ghana, Ethiopia and Rwanda.

AJF advocated for a role for the Rule of Law in the post-2015 development agenda, and petitioned the President of the United Nations General Assembly on this issue together with Advocates for International Development. This initiative was endorsed by the Business Council for Africa, among others.

Africa Justice Foundation ended its operations in June 2018.

References

External links 
  Africa Justice Foundation

2010 establishments in the United Kingdom
Charities based in London
Organizations established in 2010